Ristfeuchthorn is a mountain of Bavaria, Germany.

It is a very well-developed summit, which is accessible from different sides. Nearby is the white Schneizlreuth gorge. In the spring after the snow melt are many waterfalls.

References

External links
"Ristfeuchthorn", German wikipedia

Mountains of Bavaria
Chiemgau Alps
Mountains of the Alps